The Kosovo Regiment  was an Axis military unit created after Italian capitulation in November 1943 in Kosovska Mitrovica, Territory of the Military Commander in Serbia (modern day Kosovo) by Nazi Germany, consisting of local Albanians.

Background 

Following the capitulation of Italy from the war, Xhafer Deva helped form a provisional government under German occupation and set up the Second League of Prizren alongside other Albanian nationalists. The Kosovo Regiment was established as military formation of the Second League of Prizren. The regiment was established by the Central Committee of the Second League of Prizren. The Germans entrusted the establishment of the Kosovo Regiment to Bajazit Boletini. The commander of the regiment was Bajazit Boletini, while commanders of regiment's battalions were Rasim Dajči, Jusuf Boletini (Bajazit's brother) and Rizo Agaj.

The number of Albanians who joined this regiment was around 1,000 or 1,500.

Activities 

On 3 December 1943 the regiment murdered 30 Serbs in village Rakoš, on 4 December the regiment killed 34 Serbs in Đakovica and another 36 Serbs in village Siga.

This regiment was used against Partisans in neighboring regions.

Between 4 and 7 December 1943, 400 soldiers of Kosovo Regiment commanded by Xhafer Deva surrounded Peć and committed mass murder of local Serbs and Montenegrins, killing at least 300 people.

References

Sources 

 
 
 
 
 
 
 
 

Military units and formations of World War II
 
Albania in World War II
Serbia in World War II
Modern history of Kosovo
Kosovo Albanians
Albanian militant groups
Albanian nationalism in Kosovo
Military units and formations established in 1943
Persecution of Serbs